Walk in my shoes may refer to:

Similar names

 "Walk a Mile in My Shoes" is a 1969 song written by Joe South.
 Walk a Mile in My Shoes: The Essential '70s Masters is a box set five-disc compilation of the recorded work of Elvis Presley during the decade of the 1970s, released in 1995
 "Walking in My Shoes" is Depeche Mode's 28th UK single, 1993
 Walk in My Shoes: Conversations between a Civil Rights Legend and his Godson on the Journey Ahead is a book by Kabir Sehgal and Andrew Young released in 2010